These are the official results of the athletics competition at the 2018 Mediterranean Games which took place between 27 and 30 June 2018 in Tarragona, Spain.

Men's results

100 metres

Heats – 27 JuneWind:Heat 1: -2.4 m/s, Heat 2: -2.2 m/s, Heat 3: -1.8 m/s

Final – 28 JuneWind:-0.6 m/s

200 metres

Heats – 28 JuneWind:Heat 1: +2.6 m/s, Heat 2: +1.3 m/s

Final – 29 JuneWind:+0.1 m/s

400 metres

Heats – 27 June

Final – 28 June

800 metres

Heats – 28 June

Final – 30 June

1500 metres

Heats – 27 June

Final – 29 June

5000 metres
27 June

Half marathon
30 June

110 metres hurdles
30 JuneWind: -0.6 m/s

400 metres hurdles

Heats – 27 June

Final – 29 June

3000 metres steeplechase
27 June

4 × 100 metres relay
30 June

4 × 400 metres relay
30 June

High jump
29 June

Long jump
Qualification – 27 JuneQualifying standard: 7.90 metres

Final – 30 June

Shot put
Qualification – 27 June

Final – 27 June

Discus throw
Qualification – 27 June
{| class="wikitable sortable" style="text-align:center"
|-
!Rank !! Group !! Name !! Nationality !! #1 !! #2 !! #3 !! Result !! Notes
|- bgcolor=ddffdd
| 1 || A || align=left| Kristjan Čeh ||align=left|  || 58.59 || 58.11 || 61.98 || 61.98 || q, PB
|- bgcolor=ddffdd
| 2 || B || align=left| Giovanni Faloci ||align=left|  || 60.12 || x || 58.67 || 60.12 || q
|- bgcolor=ddffdd
| 3 || A || align=left| Apostolos Parellis ||align=left|  || 57.14 || 56.91 || 56.90 || 57.14 || q
|- bgcolor=ddffdd
| 4 || A || align=left| Hannes Kirchler ||align=left|  || x || 54.94 || 56.83 || 56.83 || q
|- bgcolor=ddffdd
| 5 || A || align=left| Georgios Tremos ||align=left|  || 53.44 || 52.39 || 56.58 || 56.58 || q
|- bgcolor=ddffdd
| 6 || B || align=left| Lois Maikel Martínez ||align=left|  || 55.92'' '|| x || x || 55.92 || q
|- bgcolor=ddffdd
| 7 || A || align=left| Martin Marković ||align=left|  || 55.62 || 55.19 || 55.51 || 55.62 || q
|- bgcolor=ddffdd
| 8 || A || align=left| Frank Casañas ||align=left|  || 55.39 || 53.90 || x || 55.39 || q
|- bgcolor=ddffdd
| 9 || A || align=left| Jordan Guehaseim ||align=left|  || 52.01 || 51.12 || 53.47 || 53.47 || q
|- bgcolor=ddffdd
| 10 || B || align=left| Tadej Hribar ||align=left|  || 52.83 || x || 53.22 || 53.22 || q
|- bgcolor=ddffdd
| 11 || B || align=left| Elbachir Mbarki ||align=left|  || 51.50 || 51.32 || 50.92 || 51.50 || q
|- bgcolor=ddffdd
| 12 || A || align=left| Ivan Kukuličić ||align=left|  || 50.77 || 50.02 || x || 50.77 || q
|-
| 13 || B || align=left| Iason Thanopoulos ||align=left|  || 49.50 || 50.15 || 48.96 || 50.15 ||
|-
| 14 || B || align=left| Tom Reux ||align=left|  || 45.98 || x || 49.18 || 49.18 ||
|-
|  || B || align=left| Francisco Belo ||align=left|  || || || ||  ||
|}Final – 29 June

Javelin throw

30 June

Women's results
100 metresHeats – 27 JuneWind:Heat 1: -1.1 m/s, Heat 2: -1.5 m/sFinal – 28 JuneWind:-0.5 m/s

200 metresHeats – 27 JuneWind:Heat 1: -0.4 m/s, Heat 2: +1.4 m/sFinal – 28 JuneWind:+0.5 m/s

400 metresHeats – 27 JuneFinal – 28 June

800 metresHeats – 27 JuneFinal – 29 June

1500 metres
30 June

5000 metres
29 June

Half marathon
30 June

100 metres hurdlesHeats – 27 JuneWind:Heat 1: -2.3 m/s, Heat 2: -2.9 m/sFinal – 29 JuneWind:-0.9 m/s

400 metres hurdlesHeats – 27 JuneFinal''' – 30 June

3000 metres steeplechase
28 June

4 × 100 metres relay
30 June

4 × 400 metres relay
30 June

Pole vault
28 June

Long jump
27 June

Triple jump
29 June

Discus throw
28 June

Hammer throw
28 June

References

External links
Results

Mediterranean Games
2018 Results
Sports at the 2018 Mediterranean Games